Mandrare  is a river in the region of Anosy in southern Madagascar. It flows into the Indian Ocean near Amboasary Sud. It becomes dry in certain months of the year.

See also

List of rivers of Madagascar

References

Rivers of Anosy
Rivers of Madagascar